Ânderson Luís da Silva (born 13 February 1981), known as Luisão, is a Brazilian former professional footballer who played as a centre back.

Luisão started his career at Juventus-SP in 1999 before moving to Cruzeiro the year later, where he spent three seasons. Then, from 2003 to 2018, the rest of his professional career was spent with Portuguese club Benfica, for which he appeared in 538 official matches, holding the club record for most international matches (127), major titles won (20) and longest-serving captain (414 matches).

A Brazilian international on 44 occasions, Luisão appeared for the country in two World Cups and three Copa América tournaments, scoring three goals.

Club career

Brazil
Born in Amparo, São Paulo, Luisão represented Clube Atlético Juventus and Cruzeiro Esporte Clube in his country, scoring a career-best 6 goals in 24 matches in his third season with the latter.

Benfica
In the summer of 2003, Luisão moved to Europe to sign with Portuguese club Benfica for a £890,000 transfer fee paid by the Lisbon-based side. He faced a tough period of adaptation, during which time he performed somewhat below his capabilities and even considered traveling back to his home country. However, he managed to score in his league debut, a 3–3 home draw against C.F. Os Belenenses on 14 September. He ended his first season winning the Taça de Portugal after Benfica defeated fierce rivals FC Porto 2–1 in the tournament final.

During the 2004–05 season Luisão featured regularly in Benfica's central defence alongside Ricardo Rocha, appearing in 29 matches and contributing heavily for Benfica's first league title in 11 years. On 24 April 2005, in a 2–1 away victory over G.D. Estoril Praia, he scored his first goal of the season, the match's equaliser. On 14 May, he found the net through a header against Lisbon rivals Sporting CP, scoring the match's only goal and ousting the opponents from the title race.

The 2005–06 season finished without silverware for Benfica, with Luisão again as an automatic first-choice. However, the team reached the season's UEFA Champions League quarter-finals, with the defender playing all the matches and minutes in the competition. On 21 February 2006, he scored in his side's 1–0 home win against holders Liverpool, which had lost just 1 of 13 European matches the previous year and 5 of 41 away from home. He also started in the second leg, a 2–0 win at Anfield.

During the 2006–07 season, Luisão was named club captain in some matches due to injuries to Nuno Gomes and Petit. The club again failed to secure any major honours in the season. At the end of the season, his agent said that "Luisão want[ed] to leave" the club, though he eventually stayed.

During the following season, in January 2008, Luisão was involved in an on-field argument with Greek teammate Kostas Katsouranis during a league match against Vitória de Setúbal. The argument arose after Katsouranis' misplaced pass, which forced the Brazilian to commit a foul in order to stop play. After receiving a yellow card for the foul, Luisão criticized Katsouranis, who responded in a similar manner. The two players were on the point of breaking into violence before teammates separated them. Both players were then quickly substituted and issued suspensions by the club, with the two later apologizing to each other. Again during the season, Luisão dealt with some injuries and inconsistent play and also addressed rumours of another possible move from Benfica.

Luisão's start to the 2008–09 season began in scoring fashion, netting a goal in the 59th minute of the UEFA Cup first round match at S.S.C. Napoli in a 2–3 loss. It was his first match of the season in European competitions and his first goal of the season in all competitions. In the following season, he would enjoy his best season as a professional, appearing in 45 total official matches (4,050 minutes played, with six goals) as Benfica won the league and renewed its Taça da Liga supremacy, also reaching the last eight in the newly-branded UEFA Europa League.

On 28 August 2010, Luisão scored – through a header – against Vitória de Setúbal at home as ten-men Benfica eventually won the match 3–0. On 14 September, he entered the Champions League's history books after opening the scoring against Israeli side Hapoel Tel Aviv in the competition's group stage.

On 11 August 2012, in the last minutes of the first half of a friendly with Fortuna Düsseldorf, Luisão reportedly pushed referee Christian Fischer to the ground as he was about to send off teammate Javi García for two reckless challenges on Oliver Fink. The referee refused to resume the match and suspended it, proceeding to announce that he would take legal action against Luisão. On 14 September, Luisão was initially suspended for two months for his actions, also being fined €2,550. The ruling of the Portuguese Football Federation was still subject to the approval of FIFA, which was confirmed shortly after, causing the player to miss 11 matches, including the Champions League matches against Celtic and FC Barcelona.

On 13 March 2014, while appearing in his 117th match in European competitions, Luisão scored two goals to help Benfica to a 3–1 away win against Tottenham Hotspur in the first leg of the Europa League round of 16. In the following season, Luisão equalized Eusébio with a total of 440 official appearances at Benfica after appearing in a 0–4 win at Marítimo in the Primeira Liga on 18 January 2015. 

On 26 April 2015, then with 229 matches, Luisão surpassed Mário Coluna as the longest-serving captain at Benfica. A day after turning 36, on 14 February 2017, he made his 500th appearance in a Champions League win against Borussia Dortmund; only Nené, António Veloso and Coluna had reached that mark for Benfica before. By winning the 2017 Supertaça Cândido de Oliveira, he became the Benfica player with most titles won for the club, overtaking Nené to 20.

On 25 September 2018, at the Estádio da Luz, Luisão announced his retirement from professional football.

International career

Luisão was called-up for the 2001 FIFA World Youth Championship, but the Brazilians crashed out to Ghana in the quarter-finals.

Luisão made his debut for Brazil on 23 July 2001, against Honduras, in the quarter-finals of 2001 Copa América.

In 2003, Luisão was named in the squad for the 2003 CONCACAF Gold Cup, where Brazil, competing with their under-23 team, finished as runner-up to Mexico. On 8 December 2003, Luisão was called up by Ricardo Gomes for the Olympic qualification tournament with the consent of Benfica. However, a few days later, the club changed its position and decided not to release the player due to a derby against Sporting.

He represented the nation in its 2004 Copa América win, playing in all six matches, including a 1–2 loss against Paraguay – where he was team captain – and the final against Argentina where he scored his first international goal.

In the next year, Luisão was named in the Brazilian squad for the 2005 FIFA Confederations Cup, but did not play a single second, meeting the same fate in the 2006 FIFA World Cup. After the latter tournament, when Dunga was hired as the new coach, he began to play more often.

Luisão was summoned for the 2009 Confederations Cup, playing in four of Brazil's five matches, including the 1–0 victory over South Africa in the semifinals, and the 3–2 win against the United States in the final, partnering with FC Bayern Munich's Lúcio.

Again as a reserve player, Luisão was selected for the 2010 World Cup in South Africa, after a solid club season, being an unused squad member as Brazil exited in the quarter-finals.

Personal life
Luisão's younger brothers, Alex Silva and Andrei Silva, are also football defenders. Luisão is a member of Atletas de Cristo, a group of Brazilian Evangelical footballers also counting Kaká, Edmílson and Cris amongst its ranks.

Career statistics

Club
Sources:

International

International appearances

International goals
Source:

Honours

Club
Cruzeiro
Campeonato Brasileiro Série A: 2003
Copa do Brasil: 2000, 2003
Campeonato Mineiro: 2003
Benfica
Primeira Liga: 2004–05, 2009–10, 2013–14, 2014–15, 2015–16, 2016–17
Taça de Portugal: 2003–04, 2013–14, 2016–17
Taça da Liga: 2008–09, 2009–10, 2010–11, 2011–12, 2013–14, 2014–15, 2015–16
Supertaça Cândido de Oliveira: 2005, 2014, 2016, 2017
UEFA Europa League runner-up: 2012–13, 2013–14

International
Brazil
Copa América: 2004
FIFA Confederations Cup: 2005, 2009
CONCACAF Gold Cup: Silver medal 2003

Individual
Cosme Damião Awards – Footballer of the Year: 2009

References

External links

 
 

1981 births
Living people
Footballers from São Paulo (state)
Brazilian Christians
Brazilian footballers
Association football defenders
Campeonato Brasileiro Série A players
Clube Atlético Juventus players
Cruzeiro Esporte Clube players
Primeira Liga players
S.L. Benfica footballers
Brazil international footballers
2001 Copa América players
2003 CONCACAF Gold Cup players
2004 Copa América players
2005 FIFA Confederations Cup players
2006 FIFA World Cup players
2009 FIFA Confederations Cup players
2010 FIFA World Cup players
2011 Copa América players
Copa América-winning players
FIFA Confederations Cup-winning players
Brazilian expatriate footballers
Expatriate footballers in Portugal
Brazilian expatriate sportspeople in Portugal
Naturalised citizens of Portugal